Alfred "Al" William McCoy (born June 8, 1945) is an American historian and educator. He is the Fred Harvey Harrington Professor of History at the University of Wisconsin–Madison. He specializes in the history of the Philippines, foreign policy of the United States, European colonisation of Southeast Asia, illegal drug trade, and Central Intelligence Agency covert operations.

Career
Born in Concord, Massachusetts to Alfred Mudge McCoy, Jr. and Margarita Piel, a noted urban planner, educator, and descendant of the originators of Piels Beer, McCoy graduated from the Kent School in 1964, where he earned varsity letters in football, rowing, and wrestling. He earned a Bachelor of Arts in European History from Columbia University in 1968, a Master of Arts in Asian Studies from the University of California, Berkeley in 1969, and a Doctor of Philosophy in Southeast Asian History from Yale University in 1977. His dissertation, advised by Harold C. Conklin was entitled Yloilo: Factional Conflict in a Colonial Economy, Iloilo Province, Philippines, 1937-1955, which examined the region of Iloilo.

McCoy began his teaching career as a lecturer at Yale, while he was still a doctoral student (1976-1977). He spent the next academic year as a research fellow at the Australian National University. McCoy remained in Australia at the University of New South Wales as a lecturer (1978-1981), senior lecturer (1981-1985), and was eventually promoted to associate professor (1985-1989). He returned to the United States in 1989 as a full professor of history at the University of Wisconsin-Madison, where he has since spent his career. McCoy has been given two endowed chairs during his tenure: John R.W. Smail (2004-2015) and Fred Harvey Harrington (2015-present).

Congressional testimony
On June 2, 1972, while studying at Yale, McCoy testified before the United States Senate Appropriations Subcommittee on State, Foreign Operations, and Related Programs of which Senator William Proxmire was chairman, and accused American government officials, such as G. McMurtrie Godley and Nelson G. Gross, of covering up drug trafficking in Southeast Asia. Soon after, McCoy reaffirmed these beliefs in a letter to Congressman Les Aspin.

McCoy uncovered drug trafficking methods for heroin and opium throughout Southeast Asia and to American troops stationed there by high-ranking government officials: Commander Ouane Rattikone and General Vang Pao (Laos); and President Nguyễn Văn Thiệu and General Đặng Văn Quang (Vietnam). McCoy also cited their ties with the Mafia, namely a visit to Saigon in 1968 by Santo Trafficante Jr. Senator Gale W. McGee dismissed the allegations and accused McCoy of McCarthyism, which was immediately rebutted. Senator Proxmire requested additional evidence and documentation to which McCoy responded his forthcoming book on the topic would serve as such. In that same year, McCoy's book, The Politics of Heroin in Southeast Asia, was published by Harper and Row. He restated that the Central Intelligence Agency was knowingly involved in the trade of heroin in the Golden Triangle.

Documenting the Marcos dictatorship 
McCoy's work on the administration of Philippine President Ferdinand Marcos has influenced not only the academic documentation regarding the dictatorship, but in some cases had a direct impact on the actual events - such as the publication in the New York Times of his investigation on Marcos' "fake medals," just week before the 1986 Philippine presidential election and Marcos' eventual ouster during the People Power Revolution.

Awards
1985 - Philippine National Book Award
1995 - Philippine National Book Award
1998 - Fulbright-Hays Faculty Research Abroad
2001 - Philippine National Book Award
2001 - Association for Asian Studies, Grant Goodman Prize
2004 - University of Wisconsin Graduate School, J.R.W. Smail Chair in History
2011 - Association for Asian Studies, George Kahin Prize
2012 - Yale Graduate School Alumni Association, Wilbur Cross Medal
2012 - University of Wisconsin-Madison, Hilldale Award for Arts and Humanities

Filmography
Film credits include:

Television credits include:

Bibliography

Books 
Laos: War and Revolution, with Nina S. Adams. New York: Harper & Row (1970).
The Politics of Heroin in Southeast Asia: CIA Complicity in the Global Drug Trade. New York: Harper & Row (1972).
Priests on Trial: Father Gore and Father O'Brien Caught in the Crossfire Between Dictatorship and Revolution. New York: Penguin Books (1984).
Closer Than Brothers: Manhood at the Philippine Military Academy. New Haven: Yale University Press (1999).
A Question of Torture: CIA Interrogation, from the Cold War to the War on Terror. New York: Metropolitan Books (2006). .
Policing America's Empire: The United States, the Philippines, and the Rise of the Surveillance State. Madison, Wis.: University of Wisconsin Press (2009).
Colonial Crucible: Empire in the Making of the Modern American State. Madison, Wis.: University of Wisconsin Press (2009).
An Anarchy of Families: State and Family in the Philippines. Madison, Wis.: University of Wisconsin Press (2009).
Torture and Impunity: The U.S. Doctrine of Coercive Interrogation. Madison, Wis.: University of Wisconsin Press (2012).
Endless Empire: Spain's Retreat, Europe's Eclipse, America's Decline. Madison, Wis.: University of Wisconsin Press (2012).
Beer of Broadway Fame: The Piel Family and Their Brooklyn Brewery. SUNY Press (2016).
In the Shadows of the American Century: The Rise and Decline of US Global Power. Chicago: Haymarket Books (2017).
To Govern the Globe: World Orders and Catastrophic Change. Chicago: Haymarket Books (2021).

Articles 
"Flowers of Evil: The CIA and the Heroin Trade." Harper's Magazine (July 1972), pp. 47–53.
"A Correspondence with the CIA." New York Review of Books, vol. 19, no. 4 (Sep. 21, 1972).
"The Afghanistan Drug Lords." Convergence (Fall 1991), pp. 11–12, 14.
 "Lord of Drug Lords: One Life as Lesson for US Drug Policy." Crime, Law and Social Change, vol. 30, no. 4 (Nov. 1998), pp. 301–331.
 "Science in Dachau’s Shadow: Hebb, Beecher, and the Development of CIA Psychological Torture and Modern Medical Ethics." Journal of the History of the Behavioral Sciences, vol. 43, no. 4 (Fall 2007), pp. 401–417. .
"Searching for Significance among Drug Lords and Death Squads: The Covert Netherworld as Invisible Incubator for Illicit Commerce." Journal of Illicit Economies and Development, vol. 1, no. 1 (Jan. 14, 2019), pp. 9–22.

Interviews 
 "Alfred McCoy Interviewed." Interview by Nelson Benton. CBS Morning News (Aug. 8, 1972).
 "An Interview with Alfred W. McCoy." Interview by Frank McGee. Today Show (NBC) (Aug. 15, 1972).
"Name: Alfred McCoy, Occupation: Author." Interview by John Stapleton. The Tagg File (1980), pp. 5, 7–8, 10–11. Full transcript.
 "The Future of the American Empire." Interview by Nick Turse. The Nation (Nov. 24, 2017).
 Alfred McCoy's interviews on Democracy Now!

See also
Allegations of CIA drug trafficking

References

External links
Curriculum Vitae
 Alfred W. McCoy at Library of Congress
University of Wisconsin-Madison profile
Full-text publications at ResearchGate

1945 births
Living people
20th-century American historians
21st-century American historians
21st-century American male writers
American expatriates in Australia
American male non-fiction writers
American non-fiction writers
American people of German descent
Columbia College (New York) alumni
Kent School alumni
Non-fiction writers about the French Connection
People from Concord, Massachusetts
Scientific American people
University of California, Berkeley alumni
Academic staff of the University of New South Wales
University of Wisconsin–Madison faculty
Yale Graduate School of Arts and Sciences alumni
Yale University faculty
Fulbright alumni